A smectite (from ancient Greek σμηκτός smektos 'lubricated'; σμηκτρίς smektris 'walker's earth', 'fuller's earth'; rubbing earth; earth that has the property of cleaning) is a mineral mixtures of various swelling sheet silicates (phyllosilicates), which have a three-layer 2:1 (TOT) structure and belong to the clay minerals. Smectites mainly consist of montmorillonite, but can often contain secondary minerals such as quartz and calcite.

Terminology
In clay mineralogy, smectite is synonym of montmorillonite (also the name of a pure clay mineral phase) to indicate a class of swelling clays. The term smectite is commonly used in Europe and in the UK while the term montmorillonite is preferred in North America, but both terms are equivalent and can be used interchangeably. For industrial and commercial applications, the term bentonite is mostly used in place of smectite or montmorillonite.

Mineralogical structure

The 2:1 layer (TOT) structure consists of two silica (SiO2) tetrahedral (T) layers which are electrostatically cross-linked via an Al2O3 (gibbsite), or Fe2O3, octahedral (O) central layer. The TOT elementary layers are not rigidly connected to each other but are separated by a free space: the interlayer hosting hydrated cations and water molecules. Smectite can swell because of the reversible incorporation of water and cations in the interlayer space. 

The TOT layers are negatively charged because of the isomorphic substitution of Si(IV) atoms by Al(III) atoms in the two external silica tetrahedral layers and because of the replacement of Al(III) or Fe(III) atoms by Mg2+ or Fe2+ cations in the inner gibbsite octahedral layer. As the +4 charges born by Si(IV), and normally compensated by -4 charges from the surrounding oxygen atoms, become +3 due to the substitution of Si(IV) by Al(III), an electrical imbalance occurs: +3 -4 = -1. The excess of negative charges in the TOT layer has to be compensated by the presence of positive cations in the interlayer. The same reasoning also applies to the gibbsite central layer of the TOT elementary unit when an Al3+ ion is replaced by a Mg2+ ion in a gibbsite octahedra. The electrical imbalance is: +2 -3 = -1.

Role of interlayer cations in the swelling process

The main cations in the smectite interlayers are Na+ and Ca2+. The sodium cations are responsible for the highest swelling of smectite while calcium ions have lower swelling properties. Calcium smectite has significantly less swelling capacity than sodium smectite but is also less prone to shrinking when desiccated.

The degree of hydration of the cations and their corresponding hydrated radii explain the swelling or the shrinking behaviour of phyllosilicates. Other cations such as Mg2+ and K+ ions exhibit even a more contrasted effect: highly hydrated magnesium ions are "swellers" as in vermiculite (totally expanded interlayer) while poorly hydrated potassium ions are "collapsers" like in illite (totally collapsed interlayer). 

As the interlayer space of smectites is more open and so more easily accessible to water and cations, smectites exhibit the highest cation-exchange capacity (CEC) of clay minerals commonly found in the soils. Only more expandable vermiculite and some rarer alumino-silicate minerals (zeolites) with inner channel structure can exhibit a higher CEC than smectite.

Formation process

Smectites are formed from the weathering of basalt, gabbro, and silica-rich volcanic glass (e.g., pumice, obsidian, rhyolite, dacite). Many smectites are formed in volcanic hydrothermal system (such as geyser system) where hot water percolating through the porous matrix or the cracks of the volcanic ash deposit (pumice, pozzolan) dissolves most of amorphous silica (up to 50 wt.% of SiO2 can be dissolved), leaving smectite in place. This mecanism is responsible of the formation of the bentonite deposit (Serrata de Nijar) of Cabo de Gata in the south-east region of Almeria in Andalusia (Spain). Wyoming MX-80 bentonite was formed in a similar way during the Cretaceous Period when volcanic ashes were falling in an inner sea on the American continent. The highly porous (with a large and easily accessible  specific surface) and very reactive volcanic ashes rapidly reacted with seawater. Because of silica hydrolysis, most of silica was dissolved in seawater and removed from the ashes giving rise to the formation of smectites. Smectites found in many marine clay deposits are often formed in this way as it is the case for the Ypresian Clays found in Belgium and very rich in smectites.

Industrial applications 

Smectites are commonly used in very diverse industrial applications. In civil engineering works, it is routinely used as a thick bentonite slurry when excavating deep and narrow trenches in the ground to support the lateral walls and to avoid their collapse. It is also used as mud for drilling fluids. Smectites, more commonly called bentonite, are candidate as buffer and backfill materials to fill the space around high-level radioactive waste in deep geological repositories. Smectites also serve as additive in paints or as thickening agent for various preparations.

See also 
 Argillaceous minerals
 Bentonite
 Clay
 Clay chemistry
 Clay mineral
 Clay–water interaction
 Expansive clay
 Hectorite
 Montmorillonite
 Nontronite
 Saponite

References

Further reading 
 
 Mitchell, J. K. (2001). Physicochemistry of soils for geoenvironmental engineering. In Geotechnical and geoenvironmental engineering handbook (pp. 691-710). Springer, Boston, MA.
 Mitchell, J. K., & Soga, K. (2005). Fundamentals of soil behavior (Vol. 3). New York: John Wiley & Sons.
 Mackenzie, R. C., & Mitchell, B. D. (1966). Clay mineralogy. Earth-Science Reviews, 2, 47-91.
 Jeans, C. V., Merriman, R. J., Mitchell, J. G., & Bland, D. J. (1982). Volcanic clays in the Cretaceous of southern England and Northern Ireland. Clay Minerals, 17(1), 105-156. https://doi.org/10.1180/claymin.1982.017.1.10
 Wagner, J. F. (2013). Chapter 9: Mechanical properties of clays and clay minerals. In: Developments in Clay Science, 5, 347-381. Elsevier. https://doi.org/10.1016/B978-0-08-098258-8.00011-0

External links 

Clay minerals group
Bentonite
Aluminium minerals
Calcium minerals
Sodium minerals
Medicinal clay
Phyllosilicates